The 1991–92 Arizona Wildcats men's basketball team represented the University of Arizona as members of the Pacific-10 Conference during the 1991–92 season. The team's head coach was Lute Olson. The team played its home games in McKale Center.

After going 13–5 to finish third in the Pac-10 during the regular-season, the team was seeded third in the Southeast region of the NCAA tournament.  The Wildcats were upset in the first round by East Tennessee State, 87–80, and finished with an overall record of 24–7.

Roster

Schedule and results

|-
!colspan=9 style=| Regular Season

|-
!colspan=9 style=| NCAA Tournament

Rankings

Team players drafted into the NBA

References

Arizona
Arizona Wildcats men's basketball seasons
Arizona
Arizona Wildcats
Arizona Wildcats